The 2011 FIFA Women's World Cup qualification UEFA Group 5 was a UEFA qualifying group for the 2011 FIFA Women's World Cup. The group comprised England, Spain, Austria, Turkey and Malta. 

England won the group and advanced to the play-off rounds.

Standings

Results

External links
 Regulations of the European Qualifying Competition for the 6th FIFA Women's World Cup

5
2009–10 in English women's football
Qual
2009–10 in Spanish women's football
2010–11 in Spanish women's football
2009–10 in Maltese football
2010–11 in Maltese football
2009–10 in Austrian football
2010–11 in Austrian football
2009–10 in Turkish football
2010–11 in Turkish football